Winogradskyella crassostreae is a Gram-negative, aerobic and rod-shaped  bacterium from the genus of Winogradskyella which has been isolated from a Pacific oyster.

References

Flavobacteria
Bacteria described in 2015